El Cerrito is a village in San Miguel County, New Mexico, United States. The majority of the population is Hispanic.

Since 1939, El Cerrito has been the subject of several academic studies and books.  Its prominence is due to the isolation of the village from major transportation routes and population centers and its Hispanic culture.

History

Prior to 1786, when a peace treaty was concluded with the Comanches, Spanish settlements in New Mexico were confined to the Rio Grande valley and nearby.  The reduced threat from the Comanches, the most numerous and dangerous of the Indian peoples surrounding the New Mexican settlements, permitted the expansion of the Spanish eastward toward the Great Plains.  El Cerrito was one of the settlements founded in the Pecos River Valley in the San Miguel del Vado Land Grant, a  area the New Mexican government gave to individuals and families in exchange for their commitment to take up residence on the frontier of the Spanish settlements. The motivations for the Pecos Valley settlements was to provide land to the growing population of New Mexico and to defend the Spanish and Puebloan settlements in the Rio Grande valley from raids by Apache and other Indian peoples.

El Cerrito was settled by people from nearby Villanueva (then called La Cuesta) from 1824 to 1827. As one of the closest New Mexican settlements to the Great Plains with its bison herds and Plains Indians, many Ciboleros (bison hunters) and Comancheros (traders with the Plains Indians) originated from El Cerrito and other Hispano communities along the Pecos River. 
 
A U.S. government survey in 1941 described El Cerrito:

El Cerrito suffered an economic blow in 1904 when the United States Court of Private Land Claims invalidated the common ownership of nearly all the land of the San Miguel del Vado Land Grant, leaving the residents of El Cerrito owning only  of irrigated land and house lots.  Over time, as private ownership by outsiders of formerly-common lands expanded, residents lost the access to the grazing lands that were the basis of the village economy. From a population of 135 in 1940, the population declined to five aged adults in the late 1960s.  The population increased to nine households in 1992 with 25 to 30 persons in full-time residence.

References

External links

Villages in San Miguel County, New Mexico
Villages in New Mexico
1824 establishments in Mexico